Eriogonum saxatile is a species of wild buckwheat known by the common name hoary buckwheat. It is native to the dry, rocky mountain slopes of California and Nevada, where it is a common plant.

Description
This is a variable perennial which may be a spindly 10 centimeters in height or a bushy 40 centimeters. The rounded or scoop-shaped leaves appear in a mat on the ground, each up to 2 or 3 centimeters wide at maximum, and densely woolly. The stout, woolly inflorescence branches and produces flower clusters at nodes. The flowers are generally red or pale yellow.

Cultivation
Eriogonum saxatile is cultivated as a low-maintenance rock garden plant.

External links

Jepson Manual Treatment - Eriogonum saxatile
Eriogonum saxatile - Photo gallery

saxatile
Flora of California
Flora of Nevada
Flora of the Sierra Nevada (United States)
Natural history of the California chaparral and woodlands
Natural history of the California Coast Ranges
Natural history of the Mojave Desert
Natural history of the Peninsular Ranges
Natural history of the San Francisco Bay Area
Natural history of the Santa Monica Mountains
Natural history of the Transverse Ranges
Garden plants of North America
Drought-tolerant plants
Flora without expected TNC conservation status